Scaptesylomima bicoloroides is a moth in the family Immidae and the sole species of genus Scaptesylomima. It was described by Lutz W. R. Kobes in 1989. It is found on Sumatra.

References

Immidae
Moths of Indonesia
Monotypic moth genera